Bolqan Hasan Kandi (also Romanized as Bolqān Ḩasan Kandī; also known as Bolqān) is a village in Aliabad Rural District, in the Central District of Hashtrud County, East Azerbaijan Province, Iran. At the 2006 census, its population was 90, in 15 families.

References 

Towns and villages in Hashtrud County